The Waldnaab (Northern Bavarian: Woidnaab, in its upper course: Tirschenreuther Waldnaab) is the left-hand, eastern and longest headstream of the River Naab in the Upper Palatinate (Bavaria, Germany). At its confluence with the Haidenaab near Luhe-Wildenau, the Naab is formed.

Course

The Tirschenreuth Waldnaab 
Its source, also called the Kreuzbrunnen, lies in the district of Tirschenreuth, near Silberhütte. From its wellspring the water flows for just under three metres on German soil, before crossing into Bohemia for almost a kilometre, where it is known as the Lesní Nába, and then flowing northwest, re-crossing the German border and reaching  Bärnau.
As a result of seasonal fluctuations in the water table and the increasing degradation of the wellspring, its water reaches the surface initially a few metres away from the actual spring, then further and further away as the year wears on and eventually appears on the Czech side of the border.
During the Cold War the spring was a very popular destination for walkers, even though it was next to the heavily guarded border. When collecting blueberries between the border posts, pickers were often closely watched by uniformed guards from both sides.

The first village that the Waldnaab passes through after leaving the forest is the eponymous Naab. 
Next it swings northwards and reaches the village of Tirschenreuth, where it turns west again and flows through the Waldnaabaue (Waldnaab water meadows), meandering its way through the many lakes in the area.

Passing Falkenberg Castle in Falkenberg it flows southwest and reaches the rocky Waldnaabtal (Waldnaab valley), where the stream is at its most picturesque over the next 12 kilometres. Here, water erosion has carved a valley in the granitic bedrock surrounded by woods.
Beyond that it is joined at Neuhaus/Windischeschenbach by the Fichtelnaab approaching from the northwest.

The Waldnaab below Windischeschenbach 
From there the Waldnaab heads south, accompanied most of the way by the A 93 motorway and the B 15 federal road, flowing through Neustadt, Altenstadt and Weiden, where it picks up the Schweinnaab coming from the west, before reaching Luhe-Wildenau. There it is joined in the village of Unterwildenau by the Haidenaab to form the Naab, which flows into the River Danube near Regensburg-Mariaort.

Waldnaab Valley 
The rich natural environment of the Waldnaab Valley is very popular, particularly with walkers. The erosion of granite has produced a great number of rock formations, such as the Kammerwagen, the Tischstein or the Butterfass in this nature reserve. There are also the sites of three old castles on the rocks of Altneuhaus, Herrenstein and Schwarzenschwal.

Largest tributaries

Sources 
 Die Naab – mit Waldnaab, Fichtelnaab, Haidenaab. 144 Seiten, Pustet, Regensburg.()

References

External links 
 Source of the Waldnaab 
 Aerial photographs of this landscape; key word: Waldnaab 
 The Waldnaab valley between Falkenberg and Windischeschenbach 

Rivers of Bavaria
Nature reserves in Bavaria
Tirschenreuth (district)
Rivers of the Upper Palatine Forest
Rivers of Germany